Pyotr Alekseyevich Bezobrazov (29 January 1845 – 17 July 1906) was an admiral in the Imperial Russian Navy.

Early career

Born into an old Bezobrazov noble family, Pyotr began his naval service as a midshipman on the frigate Dmitry Donskoy from 1864 to 1866. He was promoted to warrant officer in 1866, to lieutenant in 1870 and to lieutenant-commander in 1880. He became executive officer of the frigate Svetlana in 1883. He became captain 2nd rank in 1885 after commanding a number of gunboats, and to captain, 1st rank in 1890. From 1893 to 1897, he was captain of the armoured cruiser , which visited ports in the eastern United States as part of the celebration of the 1893 Chicago World Exposition. He was then appointed captain of the battleship .

Bezobrazov was promoted to rear admiral in 1897, and served as chief of staff of the naval base at Kronstadt in 1898, and deputy commander of the Baltic Fleet from 1898 to 1901. He was made deputy commander of the Black Sea Fleet from 1901 to 1903, and promoted to vice admiral on 1 January 1904.

Russo-Japanese War
After the start of the Russo-Japanese War and the death of Vice Admiral Stepan Makarov, Bezobravov was appointed commander of the First Pacific Squadron on 8 May 1904. He arrived at Vladivostok on 12 June 1904 via the Trans-Siberian Railroad, but was unable to reach the squadron at Port Arthur due to the Japanese blockade. For this mission, he was awarded the Order of St Vladimir, 2nd class with swords.

On 27 September 1904, Bezobravov was promoted to command the Baltic Fleet and to the post of acting Chief of the Naval Staff in place of Admiral Zinovy Rozhestvensky  (a position which he held to July 1906), and returned to St Petersburg. He died in St Petersburg and his grave was at the Novodevichy Cemetery.

Awards
 Order of St Vladimir 4th degree, 1890
 Order of St Vladimir 3rd degree, 1894
 Order of St Vladimir 2nd degree, with swords, 1904
 Order of St. Anne 3rd degree
 Order of St. Anne 2nd degree
 Order of St. Anne 1st degree, 1903
 Order of St. Stanislaus 3rd degree
 Order of St. Stanislaus 2nd degree
 Order of St. Stanislaus 1st degree, 1900
 Order of the Rising Sun (Japan), 2nd class, 1901
 Order of the Crown (Romania), 1901
 Order of Military Merit (Bulgaria), 1901

References

Notes

1845 births
1906 deaths
Imperial Russian Navy admirals
Russian military personnel of the Russo-Japanese War
Recipients of the Order of Saint Stanislaus (Russian), 1st class
Recipients of the Order of St. Anna, 1st class
Recipients of the Order of St. Vladimir, 1st class
Recipients of the Order of the Rising Sun, 2nd class
Burials at Novodevichy Cemetery (Saint Petersburg)